China white, China White or Chinawhite may refer to:

China white (drug), an analog of fentanyl that resembles heroin

Arts and entertainment

Music
China White (band), a Huntington Beach, California punk rock band
"China White", a song by Scorpions on the album Blackout
Songs by He Is Legend:
"China White" on the album I Am Hollywood
"China White II" on the album Suck Out the Poison
"China White III" on the album It Hates You
"China White (Ten Buck Fuck)" on the Hard Core Logo soundtrack
Songs by Dog Fashion Disco:
"China White" on the album Erotic Massage
"China White" on the European release of the album Committed to a Bright Future
"China White" on the album Hoy-Hoy! by Little Feat
Chyna Whyte, American rapper, songwriter and author

Other uses in arts and entertainment
China White (film), a 1989 Chinese film
Chinawhite (nightclub), London
China White (comics), a villain in the Green Arrow: Year One miniseries